Park Tae-hwan (born July 29, 1997) is a South Korean football player. He plays for Verspah Oita on loan from Shonan Bellmare.

Career
Park Tae-hwan joined J1 League club Shonan Bellmare in 2016. On September 22, he debuted in Emperor's Cup (v Tokushima Vortis).

Club statistics
Updated to 20 February 2017.

References

External links

1997 births
Living people
South Korean footballers
J1 League players
Japan Football League players
Shonan Bellmare players
Verspah Oita players
Association football defenders